Angela Gabrielle White is an Australian pornographic film actress and director. She has been inducted into the AVN Hall of Fame and the XRCO Hall of Fame, and in 2020 became AVN's first three-time Female Performer of the Year winner.

Education
White graduated from the University of Melbourne in 2010 with a first-class honours degree in gender studies. There she researched women's experiences in the Australian pornography industry. White's honours thesis, "The Porn Performer: The Radical Potential of Pleasure in Pornography", was published in The Routledge Companion to Media, Sex and Sexuality in 2017.

In 2014, she said that she would like to go back to university to complete her Ph.D. and expand her studies to include a broader cross-section of performers.

Pornography career
White began her career in the adult industry in 2003.
XBIZ has called White "Australia's most well-known adult performer", and The Daily Beast has called her "The Meryl Streep of Porn."
Her first scene was shot by Score shortly after her 18th birthday.
In 2013, White launched her official website, angelawhite.com.

In October 2014, White signed a distribution deal with Girlfriends Films to release films. In the same month, Fleshlight, makers of a masturbation tool for men, named White their newest Fleshlight Girl. She is the first Australian to be named a Fleshlight Girl.

In September 2016, in an interview with XBIZ, White said she had moved to the United States and signed with Spiegler Girls to shoot for companies like Brazzers, Naughty America, and Jules Jordan.

In January 2018, White co-hosted the 35th annual AVN Awards Show in Las Vegas, Nevada, alongside comedian Aries Spears and webcam star Harli Lotts.

In October 2021, White signed an exclusive contract with Brazzers. Brazzers producer Ryan Hogan said at the time White represented "the absolute peak of professionalism and stardom in our industry. Everybody knows Angela White."

In July 2022, Brazzers released "Sexually Rated Programming," a short starring White "set in a dystopian world that sees Angela free a submissive society brainwashed by anti-erotic propaganda." The scene features a blowbang.

Webcam modelling
White has done regular work as a webcam model.

In an interview with Adult Video News in January 2014, White discussed how she enjoyed connecting with fans through webcam and stated she did not see a time when she would stop doing it. She said she felt the adult industry would move more toward live shows to get around the issues associated with piracy.

Awards and nominations

White was inducted into the AVN Hall of Fame in 2018. White won the AVN Female Performer of the Year award in 2018 and 2019, being only the second woman to do so in two back-to-back years.
In 2020, she went on to win the award for a third year in a row (as well as the AVN Award for Best Leading Actress), becoming the first person to win Female Performer of the Year in three consecutive years.

Appearances in other media

Political activities 
In 2010, White ran as a political candidate for the Australian Sex Party in the 2010 Victorian state election, winning 2.9 per cent of the vote.  White ran to advocate for sex workers' rights, specifically to oppose Australian Green Party candidate Kathleen Maltzahn, who advocated banning brothels. She told BuzzFeed, "My angle wasn't necessarily to win. I wanted to make sure that [Maltzahn] didn't win". During the election, White sent copies of her DVDs to state attorney general Rob Hulls in her bid to reduce regulations for X18+ films.

In 2013, White and fellow Australian Sex Party candidate Zahra Stardust became the first political candidates to film a pornographic scene together.

Filmography

Publications
 "The Porn Performer". In Smith, Clarissa; Attwood, Feona; McNair, Brian (eds.). The Routledge Companion to Media, Sex and Sexuality. 2017. pp. 394–404. . .

References

Further reading

External links

 
 
 
 

Actresses from Sydney
Australian emigrants to the United States
Bisexual women
Australian pornographic film actresses
AVN Award winners
Living people
University of Melbourne alumni
Webcam models
Women pornographic film directors
1985 births